Bruno Bichir Nájera (born 6 October 1967) is a Mexican actor and one of the members of the Bichir family.

Biography
Bichir was born in Mexico City. He started his acting career at the age of five in several theater, film and television series. He made his film debut in a minor role for Under Fire. In 1986, he obtained a role in Frida, naturaleza viva, a film about the life of Frida Kahlo, he studied at the Centro de Capacitación Cinematográfica ("Center of Film Training") in Mexico City.

On television, he acted on three telenovelas with Televisa, before starring in Háblame de amor ("Talk to me about love"). In 1999, he produced and starred in Benjamin Cann's A Breakfast Chronicle, in which he was nominated for the Ariel Award for Best Actor. In 2001, he and Demián Bichir starred in the Spanish co-production of Don't Tempt Me, and they were nominated for the Best Bichir in a Film at the MTV Movie Awards-Mexico. Bichir made a 2018 guest appearance on the DC Universe series Titans as the first actor to portray Doom Patrol leader the Chief in live-action, although the role was recast with Timothy Dalton in the Doom Patrol's eponymous series.

Awards

Ariel Award
7 Ariel Awards, including:
Best Actor
 2001 nomination for Crónica de un desayuno
 1996 nomination for El anzuelo
 1995 nomination for El jardín del Edén
 1994 for Principio y fin
Best Supporting Actor
 1999 nomination for El evangelio de las maravillas
 1997 nomination for Amorosos fantasmas
 1993 nomination for Golpe de suerte
 1992 nomination for El patrullero

MTV Movie Awards-Mexico
 Best Bichir in a Movie
 2002 nomination for Ciudades oscuras
 2001 nomination for Sin noticias de Dios (Bendito infierno)

Valladolid International Film Festival
Best actor
 1995, for El callejón de los milagros

Filmography

Cinema of the United States
 Julia as Diego
 Casa de los Babys (2003) as Diómedes
 Death and the Compass (1992) as "drug addict II"
 Lucky Break (1992) as Vicente
 Under Fire (1983) as a boy at Jazy's house
 Sicario: Day of the Soldado (2018) as Angel (aka Deaf Guy)
 The Quarry (2020) as David Martin

Cinema of Mexico
 Un rescate de huevitos (2021)
 Las leyendas: el origen (2021)
 Un gallo con muchos huevos (2015)
 El Santos vs. La Tetona Mendoza (2012)
 La Revolución de Juan Escopeta (2011)
 Otra película de huevos y un Pollo (2009)
 Una película de huevos (2006)
 El que come y canta (loco se levanta) (2006)
 La mujer de mi hermano (2005) as Boris
 El día menos pensado (2005)
 Conejo en la luna (2004) as Antonio (English title: Rabbit on the moon)
 Brother Bear (2003) as Kenai (Latin Spanish dub)
 Si un instante (2003) as Martín
 Ciudades oscuras (2002) as Satanás
 Sin noticias de Dios (Bendito infierno) (2001) as Eduardo
 Hasta los huesos (2001) (voice)
 La toma de la embajada (2000) as Ricardo Galán, Ambassador of Mexico
 La cosa que no podría morir (2000) as Hank Huston
 La máscara de Zorro (2000) as Alejandro Murrieta/Zorro
 Extraños (1999) as Kurt
 Crónica de un desayuno (1999) as Marcos
 El evangelio de las maravillas (1998) as Gavilán
 Ciudad que se escapa (1998) as Chato
 Cruz (1998/II)
 Katuwira, donde nacen y mueren los sueños (1996) as Nicolás
 El anzuelo (1996) as Carlos
 Pez muerto no nada (1996)
 Algunas nubes (1995) as Carlos Vargas
 Midaq Alley (1995) as Abel
 Santo Enredo (1995) (TV) as Wang Chong
 Espiritus (1995)
 Nadie hablará de nosotras cuando hayamos muerto (1995) as Mani
 El plato fuerte (1995)
 El jardín del Edén (1994) as Felipe
 Días de combate (1994) as Carlos Vargas
 Tu vida y mi vida (1994)
 Amorosos fantasmas (1994)
 Un año perdido (1993)
 Principio y fin (1993) as Nicolás Botero
 ¡Aquí espantan! (1993) as Pablo
 Serpientes y escaleras (1992) as Raúl
 Anatomia de una violación (1992)
 Cazador de cabezas (1992)
 Golpe de suerte (1992)
 El patrullero (1991) as Anibal
 Luna de miel al cuarto menguante (1990)
 Llueve otra vez (1989)
 Rojo amanecer (1989) as Sergio
 Frida, naturaleza viva (1986) as a young Sandinista

Cinema of Argentina
 El mural (2010)

Stage
 Cabaret (2005–06)
 Estás ahí (2005)
 Extras

Telenovelas

TV Azteca
 Amor en custodia (2005–2006) as Conrado
 La Heredera (2004) as Santiago
 La calle de las novias (2000) as Sergio
 Háblame de amor (1999) as Esteban

Televisa
 La Culpa (1996) as Adolfo
 Sueño de amor (1993)
 Mujeres de negro (2016) as Zacarías Zaldívar

Television

Canal 11 

Yo sólo sé que no he cenado   (2012-2017)

Freeform 

 Party of Five (2020)

Netflix 

Ozark (2017)

References

External links
 Bruno Bichir profile, biosstars-mx.com; accessed 17 July 2014.
 Bruno Bichir profile, alma-Latina.net; accessed 17 July 2014.
 
  Bruno Bichir profile, cinemexicano.mty.itesm.mx; accessed 17 July 2014. 
  Interview, altazorcafe.com; accessed 17 July 2014. 
  Interview, esmas.com; accessed 17 July 2014.

1967 births
Best Actor Ariel Award winners
Living people
Male actors from Mexico City
Mexican male film actors
Mexican male stage actors
Mexican male telenovela actors
Mexican male voice actors
Mexican people of Lebanese descent